Beatrice Pelloni is an Italian mathematician specialising in applied mathematical analysis and partial differential equations. She is a professor of mathematics at Heriot-Watt University in Edinburgh, the editor-in-chief of the Proceedings of the Royal Society of Edinburgh, Section A: Mathematics, and the chair of the SIAM Activity Group on Nonlinear Waves and Coherent Structures.

Education and career
Pelloni was born on 28 June 1962 in Rome. After earning a laurea from Sapienza University of Rome in 1985, she entered graduate study at Yale University, but had to take several periods of time off from the program to raise three children. She completed her Ph.D. at Yale in 1996. Her dissertation, Spectral Methods for the Numerical Solution of Nonlinear Dispersive Wave Equations, was supervised by Peter Jones.

While still a graduate student, Pelloni also worked as a researcher for the Institute of Applied Computational Mathematics of the Foundation for Research & Technology – Hellas (IACM-FORTH).
After completing her doctorate she was a research associate at Imperial College London and then joined the University of Reading as a lecturer in 2001. At Reading she  became a professor in 2012. She moved to Heriot-Watt University in 2016.

Recognition
Pelloni was the Olga Taussky-Todd Prize Lecturer at the 2011 International Congress on Industrial and Applied Mathematics, speaking on "Boundary value problems and integrability",
and the 2019 Mary Cartwright Lecturer of the London Mathematical Society, speaking on "Nonlinear transforms in the study of fluid dynamics". She was elected Fellow of the IMA in 2012, and Fellow of the Royal Society of Edinburgh in 2020.

References

External links
Home page

1962 births
Living people
British mathematicians
British women mathematicians
Italian mathematicians
Italian women mathematicians
Sapienza University of Rome alumni
Yale University alumni
Academics of the University of Reading
Academics of Heriot-Watt University
Fellows of the Royal Society of Edinburgh